Metzneria subflavella is a moth of the family Gelechiidae. It was described by Englert in 1974. It is found in Portugal, Spain, France, Italy, Hungary, Ukraine, Russia, Iran and Slovakia.

References

Moths described in 1974
Metzneria